Turn Off the Radio Vol. 4: Revolutionary but Gangsta Grillz is a 2010 mixtape by political hip-hop duo Dead Prez. It was released on June 22, 2010. It celebrates the 10th anniversary of "Let's Get Free", is the fourth of the "Turn Off the Radio" mixtape series and the first as a "Gangsta Grillz" which are released by DJ Drama.

Track listing

Notes And Samples
Track 2: "Far from Over" Samples from "Over" by Drake
Track 4: "Exhibit M" Samples from "Exhibit C" by Jay Electronica
Track 5: "The Game Is a Battlefield" Samples from "Love Is a Battlefield" by Pat Benatar
Track 6: "Malcolm, Garvey, Huey" Samples from "Beamer, Benz or Bentley" by Lloyd Banks, Includes samples of a speech from Martin Luther King Jr., and one from Malcolm X.
Track 7: "The Beauty Within" Samples from "Nothin' on You" by B.o.B, Released on Mother's Day, May 9, 2010 as dedication to the natural beauty of black women.
Track 9: "The Movement" Samples "Make Me Better" by Fabolous
Track 10: "Gotta Luv It" Samples from "I Luv It" By Young Jeezy
Track 12: "Don't Waste It"  Samples from "Wasted" by Gucci Mane
Track 13: "Lil' Ghetto Boy$" Samples from "Lil' Ghetto Boy" by Dr. Dre
Track 14: "Overdose" Samples from "Everyday People" by Sly & the Family Stone
Track 15: "Fear Not the Revolution" Samples from "Fear" by Drake
Track 16: "Let the People Be Heard" Samples from "Kinda Like a Big Deal" by Clipse
Track 17: "RBG 'Til I Die" Samples from "I'm A G" by Lil' Keke
Track 18: "Hood News/Struggle Like Us" Samples from "Swagga Like Us" by T.I. and Jay-Z
Track 19: "The G in Me" Samples from "God in Me" by Mary Mary

References 

Dead Prez albums
2010 mixtape albums
Political music albums by American artists
Sequel albums